is a railway station on Kintetsu Railway's Nara Line in Nara, Japan.

Lines
Kintetsu Railway
Nara Line (A19)

Building
The station has an island platform and two tracks.

History

 April 30, 1914 – The station was opened as a station of Osaka Electric Tramway Co., Ltd. (Daiki)
 March 15, 1941 – Daiki consolidated Sangu Kyuko Railway and renamed Kansai Kyuko Railway Co. (Kankyu)
 September, 1941 – It renamed to "".
 June 1, 1944 – Kankyu consolidated nankai Railway and renamed Kinki Nippon Railway Co.
 April 1, 1953 – It renamed to "".
 June 28, 2003 – Kinki Nippon Railway Co. was renamed Kintetsu Corporation.
 April 1, 2007 – Starts using PiTaPa

Adjacent stations

Railway stations in Japan opened in 1914
Railway stations in Nara Prefecture
Buildings and structures in Nara, Nara